RTL Z is a Dutch free-to-cable business and financial news television channel. It displays economic changes and the stock exchange news in a banner at the bottom of the screen in the daytime. In the evenings the programming consists of documentaries.

RTL Z started on 6 June 2001 as a joint venture between Holland Media Groep and Belgian Business Television. Belgian Business Television broadcasts Kanaal Z (Canal Z) in Belgium. In 2002, Holland Media Groep took over the programme in its entirety. It was initially broadcast as a programming block on RTL 5 during daytime, and later on RTL 7 from 12 August 2005 until 6 September 2015. RTL Z relaunched as a dedicated 24-hours channel on 7 September 2015.

Previous logos

References

External links

 

Television channels in the Netherlands
RTL Nederland
Television channels and stations established in 2001
Business-related television channels